

A One Day International, or an ODI, is an international cricket match between two representative teams, each having ODI status, as determined by the International Cricket Council. An ODI differs from Test matches in that the number of overs per team is limited, and that each team has only one innings.

The ACC Asian XI was a team named for the 2005 World Cricket Tsunami Appeal, a one-off match designed to raise funds for charities following the 2004 Indian Ocean earthquake and resulting tsunami. It also competed in two Afro-Asia Cup series against an African XI, which was designed as a fund-raiser for the African Cricket Association and the Asian Cricket Council. The Afro-Asian Cup debuted in 2005 and the second tournament was played in 2007.

The rules of ODIs have changed since the first Afro-Asia Cup. During the tournament, the ICC experimented with a rule called supersub – where the twelfth man would be allowed to take to the field in the place of one of the players and would be allowed to bat and/or bowl in his place, gaining a full cap in the process. As a result, this meant there were generally 12 capped players per match instead of the regular 11, even though a player may have not participated in either batting or bowling in a match. For example, Muttiah Muralitharan bowled during the first innings of the first ODI, but was replaced by Mohammad Ashraful who batted in his place: both players are listed as having a full cap. These rules were not in place for the World Cricket Tsunami Appeal match or the 2007 Afro-Asia Cup.

Of their 7 matches played, the Asian XI have won 4 of them. Their first match resulted in a heavy 112 run loss to the World XI in the Tsunami Appeal match, and they went on to lose the opening match of the 2005 Afro-Asian Cup by two runs to the African XI. They bounced back and won the next match, however, including half centuries for each of the Sri Lankan pair Kumar Sangakkara and Mahela Jayawardene. During the deciding match, the Asian XI bowled the African XI out for 106, but soon after starting their batting performance rain fell and the game was called off: the trophy was shared.

In the 2007 competition, the Asian XI recorded a 3–0 whitewash of the Africans – winning the first two matches by 34 and 31 runs, respectively, the latter helped by Dilhara Fernando recording ODI career best bowling figures of 4/36. In the final match, the Asians fell to 72/5, but following centuries from Mahela Jayawardene (107) and Mahendra Singh Dhoni (139*) – the latter being the highest individual score ever recorded in an Afro-Asia Cup match – they posted a score of 331/8. Despite half-centuries from three of the African batsmen, however, the Asian XI won by 13 runs.

Mahela Jayawardene is the highest run-scorer of the Asian XI in the Afro-Asia Cup, with two half-centuries and a century to his name, second to Shaun Pollock, and was named Man of the Series for the 2007 competition. Zaheer Khan tops the list for most wickets with 11.

The list is arranged in the order in which each player won his first ODI cap for the Asian XI (as opposed to their national team). Where more than one player won his first ODI cap in the same match, those players are listed alphabetically by their last name. All players have represented their respective member teams of the ICC, but only the records of their games for the ACC Asian XI are given.

Cricketers
Statistics are correct as of July 8, 2007, following the conclusion of the 2007 Afro-Asia Cup.

See also
World Cricket Tsunami Appeal
2005 Afro-Asian Cup
2007 Afro-Asia Cup

Notes

References

External links
Asian Cricket Council
Cricinfo
World Cricket Tsunami Appeal tour subpage
Afro-Asian Cup 2005 tour subpage
Afro-Asia Cup 2007 tour subpage
CricketArchive
World Cricket Tsunami Appeal tour subpage
Afro-Asia Cup 2005 tour subpage
Afro-Asia Cup 2007 tour subpage

{{|date=november 2018 |bot=InternetArchiveBot |fix-attempted=yes }}

Asian XI ODI
Cricket